Vegard Ulvang (born 10 October 1963, in Kirkenes) is a Norwegian cross-country skier who won three Olympic gold medals, two silver, and one bronze. He has retired from international and Olympic competition. At the opening ceremony of the 1994 Winter Olympic Games, he took the ceremonial Olympic Oath on part of all the athletes. In addition to his Olympic achievements, he received the Holmenkollen medal in 1991 (shared with Trond Einar Elden, Ernst Vettori, and Jens Weißflog), and won the World Cup in 1990. He has also won nine gold, six silver, and two bronze medals in the Norwegian Championships. He earned nine World Cup race victories. Ulvang also won the 50 km at the Holmenkollen ski festival in 1989, 1991 and 1992.

After retiring from professional skiing, he started his own clothing line which has made him a multimillionaire.

On 25 May 2006 Ulvang was named chairman of the executive board of the International Ski Federation's (FIS) cross-country committee, taking over from Peter Petriček of Slovenia, who decided to step down after four years in the job. Ulvang was given the position without election after the board of the FIS decided unanimously that Ulvang was the best man for the job.

Ulvang is also a part of Norwegian TV 2's television travel-series Gutta på tur, together with fellow skier Bjørn Dæhlie, TV personality Arne Hjeltnes and chef Arne Brimi. He is also the creator and organizer of the Tour de Ski.

Cross-country skiing results
All results are sourced from the International Ski Federation (FIS).

Olympic Games
 6 medals – (3 gold, 2 silver, 1 bronze)

World Championships
 8 medals – (2 gold, 2 silver, 4 bronze)

World Cup

Season titles
 1 title – (1 overall)

Season standings

Individual podiums
 9 victories 
 34 podiums

Team podiums
 9 victories 
 23 podiums 

Note:    Until the 1999 World Championships and the 1994 Olympics, World Championship and Olympic races were included in the World Cup scoring system.

References

 
 Holmenkollen medalists – click Holmenkollmedaljen for downloadable pdf file 
 Holmenkollen winners since 1892 – click Vinnere for downloadable pdf file 
 IOC 1994 Winter Olympics
 

1963 births
Living people
People from Sør-Varanger
Cross-country skiers at the 1988 Winter Olympics
Cross-country skiers at the 1992 Winter Olympics
Cross-country skiers at the 1994 Winter Olympics
Holmenkollen medalists
Holmenkollen Ski Festival winners
Norwegian male cross-country skiers
Olympic cross-country skiers of Norway
Olympic gold medalists for Norway
Olympic silver medalists for Norway
Olympic bronze medalists for Norway
Skiing executives
Olympic medalists in cross-country skiing
FIS Nordic World Ski Championships medalists in cross-country skiing
FIS Cross-Country World Cup champions
Medalists at the 1988 Winter Olympics
Medalists at the 1992 Winter Olympics
Medalists at the 1994 Winter Olympics
Oath takers at the Olympic Games
Sportspeople from Troms og Finnmark